The First Kurz government ( or Kurz I for short) was the 30th Government of Austria in office from 18 December 2017 until 3 June 2019. It succeeded the Kern government formed after the 2017 legislative election. Sebastian Kurz, chairman of the centre-right Austrian People's Party, known by its initials in German as ÖVP, reached an agreement on a coalition with the far-right Freedom Party of Austria (FPÖ), setting the stage for Kurz to become chancellor of Austria—the youngest head of government in Europe—for the first time.

In the wake of the May 2019 Ibiza affair, Kurz terminated the coalition agreement and called for a snap election, which was ultimately held on 29 September 2019, after some disagreements over the timing. Kurz announced that his government would run as a minority technocratic caretaker government in the interim. However, on 27 May 2019, his government was dismissed by the National Council through a motion of no confidence, the first successful parliamentary vote of no confidence in the Second Republic. On 3 June 2019, President Alexander Van der Bellen swore in a  technocratic caretaker government led by Brigitte Bierlein, which held office until the new coalition government between the ÖVP and The Greens was sworn in. A coalition pact of the two highly dissimilar parties was jointly announced by Kurz and Green leader Werner Kogler on New Year's Day 2020.

The alliance of the conservative ÖVP with the Greens is unprecedented at the national level. It emerged from three months of dogged bargaining following the September 2019 parliamentary election, which was won by the ÖVP and the Greens, while the scandal-ridden Freedom Party and the centre-left SPÖ both suffered major setbacks. The FPÖ has since parted ways with its former leader and vice chancellor, HC Strache, but has yet to recover from the legacy of the Ibiza affair and other scandals. Meanwhile, the ÖVP under Kurz had co-opted the anti-foreigner and anti-Islamic stance of the FPÖ and won over previous supporters of the FPÖ while The Greens made a remarkable political comeback by focusing on the core issues of climate change and transparency (open government and fight against corruption). The Greens, which had been thrown out of parliament in 2017 for failure to meet the 4% threshold under Austria's version of the proportional representation system, increased their vote share to an unprecedented level of almost 14% percent, in part at the expense of the traditional centre-left SPÖ, which had failed to adapt to changing times.

As a result of the unlikely partnership between the conservative ÖVP and the Greens, the new government was set to take the charge on combating climate change and is poised to spearhead pro-environment policies in Europe, while also continuing to pursue a hard line on immigration and internal security. The latter includes deportation of migrants and pretrial detention of persons deemed a risk to public safety. In announcing his party's switch to an alliance with the Greens, Kurz declared that it is possible to protect both the environment and the country's borders; he asserted that both parties were able to realise their campaign promises in the joint government programme, which the Greens overwhelmingly ratified at a national party congress convened on 4 January 2020 in Salzburg. The Second Kurz government (dubbed Kurz-Kogler) was sworn in on 7 January 2020 by President Van der Bellen, who himself is an erstwhile leader of the Greens; Kogler serves as vice-chancellor.

Composition

Actions

See also 
Politics of Austria

References

External links 
 Government members 
 Neue ÖVP-FPÖ Regierung steht

2010s in Austria
2017 establishments in Austria
Kurz I
Cabinets established in 2017
Coalition governments